Charles J. Dunn (July 14, 1872 – November 10, 1939) was an American jurist, lawyer, and politician.

Biography
Born in Houghton County, Michigan, Dunn lived in Blue Hill, Maine and graduated from Blue Hill Academy. Dunn was admitted to the Maine bar and practiced law in Orono, Penobscot County, Maine. He resided in the Nathaniel Treat House, which is now listed on the National Register of Historic Places. Dunn was involved with the Merrill Trust and Orono Trust Companies. He was also treasurer of the University of Maine. He served in the Maine House of Representatives from 1901 to 1911 and was a Republican. Dunn was appointed to the Maine Supreme Judicial Court in 1913 and served until his death in 1939. In 1935, he was appointed chief justice of the court and served until his death.

Notes

1872 births
1939 deaths
People from Houghton County, Michigan
People from Blue Hill, Maine
People from Orono, Maine
Maine lawyers
Chief Justices of the Maine Supreme Judicial Court
Republican Party members of the Maine House of Representatives